Neodactria oktibbeha is a moth in the family Crambidae. It was described by Bernard Landry and Richard L. Brown in 2005. It is found in central Mississippi, where it is only known from prairie remnants in the Black Belt (geological formation) of Oktibbeha and Lowndes counties.

References

Crambini
Moths described in 2005
Moths of North America